The 1993 Idaho Vandals football team represented the University of Idaho in the 1993 NCAA Division I-AA football season. The Vandals, led by fifth-year head coach John L. Smith, were members of the Big Sky Conference and played their home games at the Kibbie Dome, an indoor facility on campus in Moscow, Idaho.

Led by senior All-American quarterback Doug Nussmeier, Idaho finished the regular season at 9–2 and 5–2 in the Big Sky. The Vandals made the Division I-AA playoffs and advanced to the semifinals. For three weeks in October, Idaho was at the top of the poll in Division

Notable games
Favored to repeat as conference champions, Idaho was ranked sixth in the preseason I-AA poll, and for the second consecutive year, they visited a Division I-A opponent from the WAC and won. This time it was over Utah in Salt Lake City in early October, and the Vandals were rewarded with the top ranking in  In the regular season finale, the Vandals defeated rival Boise State for the twelfth consecutive year, a 49–16 win in Moscow. Two weeks earlier, visiting Montana won the Little Brown Stein for the third consecutive year, and went undefeated in conference play. An upset loss in Bozeman to Montana State on October 23 ended the Vandals' run at the top of the national poll.

Division I-AA playoffs
For the eighth time in nine seasons, the Vandals made the 16-team I-AA  playoffs and were ranked eleventh in the regular season's final poll. Idaho went on the road and defeated #4 Northeast Louisiana, then beat undefeated Boston University in the Kibbie Dome. In the semifinals in Ohio at Youngstown State, the Vandals fell 35–16 to Jim Tressel's Penguins, the eventual national champions.

Notable players and coaches
Senior quarterback Nussmeier, a four-year starter (1990–93), was an All-American and won the Walter Payton Award. He was selected by the New Orleans Saints in the 1994 NFL Draft and played several seasons as a reserve prior to starting his career as a coach. Redshirt freshman defensive end Ryan Phillips was also a four-year starter; he moved to outside linebacker as a senior in 1996, and was selected in the third round of the 1997 NFL Draft by the New York Giants. He played five seasons in the NFL, including Super Bowl XXXV in January 2001.

Former Vandal quarterback Scott Linehan, a future NFL head coach, was the offensive coordinator and two future Vandal head coaches were on the staff: Nick Holt (defensive line) and Paul Petrino (receivers).

Schedule

Roster

NFL Draft
One Vandal senior was selected in the 1994 NFL Draft, which was seven rounds (222 selections).

List of Idaho Vandals in the NFL Draft

References

External links
Gem of the Mountains: 1994 University of Idaho yearbook – 1993 football season
Official game program: Idaho at Utah – October 2, 1993
Idaho Argonaut – student newspaper – 1993 editions

Idaho
Idaho Vandals football seasons
Idaho Vandals football